Ashot Ghazaryan  (born 15 May 1949), is an Armenian singer, showman, presenter and actor. He is an honored artist of Armenia since 2014.

Early life and education 

Ghazaryan was born on May 15, 1949, in Yerevan. He finished the secondary school named after Yeghishe Charents in 1967. From 1968 till 1973, he studied at the Yerevan Academy of Fine Arts.

Working life 
In 1967–1968 and 1975–1976, he has worked at Hrachya Ghaplanyan Drama Theatre as an actor. From 1973 till 1974, he has also worked at Sundukyan State Academic Theatre.

References

External links 

1949 births
Living people
Male actors from Yerevan
Musicians from Yerevan
20th-century Armenian male singers
Armenian male film actors
21st-century Armenian male actors
20th-century Armenian male actors